Royal Consort Jeong of the Kaeseong Wang clan (Hangul: 정비 개성 왕씨, Hanja: 靜妃 開城 王氏; d. 1345) was a Korean royal family member as the great-granddaughter of Duke Yangyang, while Princess Jeonghwa was her aunt. She also became a Korean royal consort as the 3rd wife of her fourth cousin once removed, King Chungseon of Goryeo.

In 1287, she was originally chosen as a tribute girl (공녀, 貢女) for the Yuan dynasty, but two years later, Wang Won performed the custom and she was appointed as his princess consort and received the title of Consort Jeong (정비, 靜妃). In 1308, King Chungseon banned the same-clan marriage in his reinstatement letter and selected 15 families that could marry with the royal family. Meanwhile, she later died in 1345 (1st year reign of King Chungmok of Goryeo), but there were no records left about her tomb.

In popular culture
Portrayed by Park Hwan-hee in the 2017 MBC TV series The King in Love.

References

 

13th-century births
1345 deaths
Consorts of Chungseon of Goryeo
14th-century Korean women
13th-century Korean women